Milden is a village in the Canadian province of Saskatchewan within the Rural Municipality of Milden No. 286 and Census Division No. 12. The village is located at the junction of Highway 15 and Highway 655 approximately 20 km west of Outlook on Highway 15.

History 
Milden incorporated as a village on July 20, 1911.

Demographics 

Economy
Local businesses include a Petro-Canada pipeline construction facility.

Notable people
 Geoff Dolan (Canadian Strongman)

See also

 List of communities in Saskatchewan
 Villages of Saskatchewan

References

Villages in Saskatchewan
Milden No. 286, Saskatchewan
Division No. 12, Saskatchewan